Eira is a district in Helsinki, Finland.

Eira may also refer to:

Places
Eira (Messenia), a town of ancient Messenia, Greece
Eira, Messenia, a municipal unit in Messenia, Greece
Eira Hospital, a hospital in the district of Helsinki, Finland
Eira River, a river in Nesset, Møre og Romsdal, Norway
City of Glen Eira, a local government area in Victoria, Australia

People
 Berit Marie Eira (born 1968), Norwegian Sami reindeer owner and politician
 Maaria Eira (1924—1999), Finnish opera singer and actress
 Sandra Andersen Eira (born 1986), Norwegian Sami politician

Animals
Tayra (Eira barbara), a carnivorous mammal that is the only member of its genus

Ships
Eira, Benjamin Leigh Smith's arctic exploration  barquentine